West Virginia Route 122 is an east–west state highway located in southern West Virginia. The western terminus of the route is at West Virginia Route 12 in Forest Hill. The eastern terminus is at U.S. Route 219 north of Rock Camp.

Major intersections

References

122
Transportation in Monroe County, West Virginia
Transportation in Summers County, West Virginia